Scopula commaria is a moth of the family Geometridae. It was named by Charles Swinhoe in 1904. It is found in Kenya.

References

Endemic moths of Kenya
Moths described in 1904
commaria
Endemic fauna of Kenya
Moths of Africa
Taxa named by Charles Swinhoe